Francis William Thacker (11 June 1876 – 1949) was an English footballer who played in the Football League for Chesterfield Town, Clapton Orient and Sheffield United.

References

1872 births
1949 deaths
English footballers
Association football midfielders
English Football League players
Sheepbridge Works F.C. players
Sheffield United F.C. players
Chesterfield F.C. players
Leyton Orient F.C. players
Rotherham Town F.C. (1899) players